Sima is a feminine given name that is used in different countries. In Iran (Persian:  سيما)  and Turkey it is a feminine name. It literally means face (and a beautiful face by implication). In India, it is usually transcribed “Seema” and also a feminine name. The meaning in Hindi is boundary.  It is also a Greek and a Hebrew name. Among Jewish communities, the name Sima (סִימָה) can be from Hebrew and Aramaic, where it means treasure  or precious, or as a nickname for someone named Simcha.

Notable people with one of these names:
 Sima Bina (born 1945), Iranian musician
 Sima Abd Rabo, Syrian activist
 Sima Samar (born 1957), Afghan political figure

Notes

Persian feminine given names